The Shire of Dalrymple was a local government area located in North Queensland, Australia, and surrounded but did not include the town of Charters Towers, at which its council and administrative centre was based.

History 

Dalrymple Division was created on 11 November 1879 as one of 74 divisions around Queensland under the Divisional Boards Act 1879 with a population of 4494. The name Dalrymple is believed to honour George Elphinstone Dalrymple, an early explorer of the region.

On 2 July 1902, the No. 1 subdivision of Dalrymple Division was excised to create a separate Shire of Queenton.

With the passage of the Local Authorities Act 1902, Dalrymple Division became the Shire of Dalrymple on 31 March 1903.

On 1 January 1930, the Shire of Ravenswood was abolished and absorbed into the Shire of Dalrymple as its No. 3 division.

On 15 March 2008, under the Local Government (Reform Implementation) Act 2007 passed by the Parliament of Queensland on 10 August 2007, the Shire of Dalrymple amalgamated with the separate City of Charters Towers to form the Charters Towers Region.

Towns and localities 
The Shire of Dalrymple included the following settlements:

 Basalt
 Black Jack
 Breddan
 Campaspe
 Crimea
 Dotswood
 Greenvale
 Hervey Range
 Homestead
 Llanarth
 Macrossan
 Mingela
 Paluma
 Pentland
 Ravenswood
 Sellheim
 Valley of Lagoons

Chairmen
 1880—1884: John Horace Deane, also Member of the Queensland Legislative Assembly for Townsville and Member of the Queensland Legislative Council
 1890: John Horace Deane
 1908: Thomas Sydney Markham
 1919—1920: John Jones, also Member of the Queensland Legislative Assembly for Kennedy
 1927: Arthur Shepherd

Population

References

External links
 University of Queensland: Queensland Places: Dalrymple Shire
 

Former local government areas of Queensland
1879 establishments in Australia
2008 disestablishments in Australia
Populated places disestablished in 2008